Xestophrys is an Asian genus of bush crickets in the tribe Copiphorini, belonging to the 'conehead' subfamily Conocephalinae.

Species
The Orthoptera Species File lists:
Xestophrys agraensis Farooqi & Usmani, 2018
Xestophrys horvathi Bolívar, 1905
Xestophrys indicus Karny, 1907
Xestophrys javanicus Redtenbacher, 1891 - type species
Xestophrys namtseringa Kumar & Chandra, 2019

References

External links 
 
 

Conocephalinae
Tettigoniidae genera
Orthoptera of Asia